This is a list of published books in English which according to reliable sources deal with the general subject of Western Sahara.

 Amnesty International – Morocco: breaking the wall of silence: the 'disappeared' of Morocco
 Amnesty International – Morocco: 'disappearances' of people of Western Sahara origin
 Anderson, Jon Lee – Guerillas: The Men and Women Fighting Today's Wars
 Arts, Karin and Pedro Pinto Leita, eds. – International Law and the Question of Western Sahara. Leiden: International Platform of Jurists for East Timor, 2007.
 Barakat, Hakim, ed. – Contemporary North Africa: Issues of Development and Integration
 Bender, Gerald J., James J. Coleman, Richard L. Sklar, eds. – African crisis areas and United States foreign policy
 Briggs, Lloyd Cabot – The Living Races of the Sahara Desert
 Briggs, Lloyd Cabot – The Tribes of the Sahara
 The British Yearbook of International Law (1978)
 Brownlie, Ian – African Boundaries: A Legal and Diplomatic Encyclopedia
 Chaliand, Gerard – The Struggle for Africa
 Chopra, Jarat – Peace-Maintenance. The Evolution of International Political Authority.
 Chopra, Jarat – United Nations determination of the Western Sahara self
 Copson, Raymond W. – Africa's Wars and Prospects for Peace
 Cottrell, Alvin J. & James Daniel Theberge, eds. – The Western Mediterranean
 Damis, John – Conflict in Northwest Africa
 Dean, David J. – The air force role in low-intensity conflict
 El-Ayouty, Yassin, ed. – The OAU after thirty years
 El-Ayouty, Yassin & I. William Zartman, eds. – The OAU after twenty years
 El Ouali, Abdelhamid – Saharan Conflict: Towards Territorial Autonomy as a Right to Democratic Self-Determination. London: Stacey International, 2008.
 Elias, Robert & Jennifer Turpin, eds. – Rethinking peace
 Firebrace, James and Jeremy Harding – Exiles of the Desert
 Furley, Oliver, ed. – Conflict in Africa
 Gallagher, Charles F. – Morocco and Its Neighbours, Part I
 German Yearbook of International Law, Vol. 19
 Gretton, John – Western Sahara: The Fight for Self-Determination
 Hacene-Djaballah, Belkacem – Conflict in Western Sahara
 Haireche, Abdel-Kader – Conflict, conflict management and cooperation in North Africa
 Harding, Jeremy – The Fate of Africa: Trial by Fire
 Harkavy, Robert E. & Stephanie Newman, eds. – Lessons of Recent Wars in the Third World, Vol. 1
 Harrell-Bond, Barbara – The Struggle for the Western Sahara Part I
 Harrell-Bond, Barbara – The Struggle for the Western Sahara Part II
 Harrell-Bond, Barbara – The Struggle for the Western Sahara Part III
 Hodges, Tony – Historical dictionary of Western Sahara
 Hodges, Tony – The Western Saharans
 Hodges, Tony – Western Sahara: The Roots of a Desert War
 Houser, George M. – No One Can Stop the Rain
 Human Rights Watch/Middle East – Keeping It Secret
 Jensen, Erik – Western Sahara: Lines in the Sand. Boulder: Lynne Rienner Publishers, 2005.
 Kamil, Leo – Fueling the Fire
 Keegan, John & Andrew Wheatcroft – Zones of conflict
 Lawless, Richard & Laila Manahan, eds. – War and refugees
 Layachi, Azzedino – Images of foreign policy
 Layachi, Azzedino – The United States and North Africa
 Legum, Colin, ed. – Africa Contemporary Record: Survey and Documents, Vol. I
 Legum, Colin, ed. – Africa Contemporary Record: Survey and Documents, Vol. II
 Legum, Colin, ed. – Africa Contemporary Record: Survey and Documents, Vol. III
 Legum, Colin, ed. – Africa Contemporary Record: Survey and Documents, Vol. IV
 Legum, Colin, ed. – Africa Contemporary Record: Survey and Documents, Vol. V
 Legum, Colin, ed. – Africa Contemporary Record: Survey and Documents, Vol. VI
 Legum, Colin, ed. – Africa Contemporary Record: Survey and Documents, Vol. VII
 Legum, Colin, ed. – Africa Contemporary Record: Survey and Documents, Vol. VIII
 Legum, Colin, ed. – Africa Contemporary Record: Survey and Documents, Vol. IX
 Legum, Colin, ed. – Africa Contemporary Record: Survey and Documents, Vol. X
 Legum, Colin, ed. – Africa Contemporary Record: Survey and Documents, Vol. XI
 Legum, Colin, ed. – Africa Contemporary Record: Survey and Documents, Vol. XII
 Legum, Colin, ed. – Africa Contemporary Record: Survey and Documents, Vol. XIII
 Legum, Colin, ed. – Africa Contemporary Record: Survey and Documents, Vol. XIV
 Legum, Colin, ed. – Africa Contemporary Record: Survey and Documents, Vol. XV
 Legum, Colin, ed. – Africa Contemporary Record: Survey and Documents, Vol. XVI
 Legum, Colin, ed. – Africa Contemporary Record: Survey and Documents, Vol. XVII
 Legum, Colin, ed. – Africa Contemporary Record: Survey and Documents, Vol. XVIII
 Legum, Colin, ed. – Africa Contemporary Record: Survey and Documents, Vol. XIX
 Legum, Colin, ed. – Africa Contemporary Record: Survey and Documents, Vol. XX
 Legum, Colin, ed. – Africa Contemporary Record: Survey and Documents, Vol. XXI
 Lippert, Anne – The Saharawi Refugees
 Lodwick, John – The Forbidden Coast
 Markovitz, Irving Leonard, ed. – Studies of power and class in Africa
 Mercker, John – The Sahrawis of Western Sahara
 Mercker, John – Spanish Sahara
 Nelson, Harold D. – Morocco: A Country Study
 Neuberger, Benyamin – National self-determination in post-colonial Africa
 Norris, H. T. – The Arab Conquest of the Western Sahara
 Olsson, Claes, ed. – The Western Sarhara Conflict: The Role of Natural Resources in Decolonization. Uppsala, Sweden: Nordiska Afrikainstitutet, 2006.
 Palin, Michael with Basil Pao – Sahara. Thomas Dunne Bks: St. Martin's, 2003. .
 Parker, Richard B. – North Africa: regional tensions and strategic concerns
 Partingdon, David H., ed. – The Middle East Annual: Issues and Events, Vol. 2, 1982
 Pazzanita, Anthony G. & Tony Hodges – A historical dictionary of Western Sahara
 Pazzanita, Anthony G. – Western Sahara. Oxford: ABC-Clio Press, 2005, .
 Pazzanita, Anthony G. and Tony Hodges – Historical dictionary of Western Sahara, 2nd ed.
 Pickart, George A. – The Western Sahara
 Price, David Lynn – Conflict in the Maghreb: the Western Sahara
 Price, David Lynn – Morocco and the Sahara
 Price, David Lynn – The Western Sahara
 Rezette, Robert – The Western Sahara and the Frontiers of Morocco
 Rivkin, Benjamin – The Western Sahara: towards a referendum
 Rothschild, David & Naomi Chazan, eds. – The Precarious Balance
 Rubinstein, Alvin Z. – Moscow's third world strategy
 Saxena, Suresh Chandra – The Liberation War in Western Sahara
 Saxena, Suresh Chandra – Self-determination in Western Sahara
 Saxena, Suresh Chandra – Western Sahara: No Alternative to Armed Struggle.
 Shelley, Toby – Endgame in the Western Sahara: What Future for Africa's Last Colony? London and New York: Zed Books, 2004.
 Sipe, Lynn F. – Western Sahara: a comprehensive bibliography
 Sixth Congress of the Polisario Front
 Somerville, Keith – Foreign military intervention in Africa
 Spenler, Chris – The Maghreb in the 1990s
 Strategic Survey, 1979, London: International Institute for Strategic Studies
 Strategic Survey, 1982–1983, London: International Institute for Strategic Studies
 Strategic Survey, 1983–1984, London: International Institute for Strategic Studies
 Strategic Survey, 1988–1989, London: International Institute for Strategic Studies
 Thompson, Virginia & Richard Adloff – The Western Saharans
 Trout, Frank E. – Morocco's Saharan Frontiers
 United Nations General Assembly Official Records – Report of the United Nations Visiting Mission to Spanish Sahara, 1975
 United Nations Yearbook, 1975
 United Nations Yearbook, 1976
 United Nations Yearbook, 1977
 United Nations Yearbook, 1978
 United Nations Yearbook, 1979
 United Nations Yearbook, 1980
 United Nations Yearbook, 1981
 United Nations Yearbook, 1982
 United Nations Yearbook, 1983
 United Nations Yearbook, 1984
 United Nations Yearbook, 1985
 United Nations Yearbook, 1986
 United Nations Yearbook, 1987
 United Nations Yearbook, 1988
 United Nations Yearbook, 1991
 United Nations Yearbook, 1992
 United Nations Yearbook, 1993
 United States State Department – Spanish Sahara: Background Notes
 Vieuchange, Michel; Vieuchange, Jean (editor). – Smara: The Forbidden City
 War and Peace. Marshall Cavendish Illustrated Encyclopedia of Postwar Conflict, vol. X
 Ware, Lewis B. – Decolonization and the Global Alliance in the Arab Maghrib
 Waring, Mowton L. – Spanish Sahara, focus of contention
 Weexsteen, Raoul, et al. – The Struggle for Sahara
 The World in Conflict 1990, London: Brassey's UK/Maxwell Pergamon
 Wright, Stephen & Janice N. Brownfoot, eds. – Africa in world politics
 Zartman, I. William – The political economy of Morocco
 Zartman, I. William – Ripe for resolution
 Zoubir, Yahia H. & Daniel Volman, eds. – International dimensions of the Western Sahara conflict

References

Citations

Sources 

 

Western Sahara
Western Sahara